Edinburgh Sheriff Court is a sheriff court in Chambers Street in Edinburgh, within the sheriffdom of Edinburgh and Borders.

History

The new court was commissioned by the Scottish Courts and Tribunals Service to replace the Old Sheriff Court in the Lawnmarket. The site they selected had previously been occupied by a part of Heriot-Watt University. Designed by John Kirkwood Wilson of PSA Projects, it was built with 16 courtrooms, at a cost of £47 million, and was officially opened to the public in September 1994.

Operations
The court deals with both criminal and civil cases. There are currently thirteen sheriffs in post at Edinburgh Sheriff Court. They sit alone in civil cases and are assisted by a jury of fifteen members selected from the electoral roll in some criminal cases (cases using solemn procedure only). The Sheriff Principal is Nigel Ross who was appointed in 2022.

References

External links

Court buildings in Scotland
Government buildings in Edinburgh
Scottish Courts and Tribunals Service
Government buildings completed in 1994
1994 establishments in Scotland